Aquatica is a 705000sq ft (17 acre) water theme park in Kochpukur, under Bhangar 2 cd block of Baruipur sub division, South 24 pgs district, Greater Kolkata, India. The theme park was started in 1999. It is one of the largest water amusement parks in and around Kolkata, as well as eastern India. It is quite a popular destination on the day of Holi. Recently another water theme park, Wet 'O' Wild, has come up adjacent to Nicco Park in the Salt Lake City area.

Location
The water theme park Aquatica is located in Kochpukur. It is close to Thakdari (Rajarhat) and also New Town (Action Area - I).
The area is well connected by public transport bus (12C/2) from Howrah station. The bus passes through Ultadanga, up to Baguiati Jora Mandir along VIP Road, takes a U turn and then passes through Kestopur Bazar and reaches New Town below Box Bridge (the bridge near to Technopolis that connects Sector V and New Town) and finally reaches Aquatica via Thakdari. Box bridge is very well connected by public transport from VIP Road side and EM Bypass side too.

There is regular Auto service from Box Bridge to Aquatica. Plenty of taxis are available to go to the place and many taxies wait there for returning passengers. While going to Aquatica, taxi driver may ask for some extra.

There are primarily two driving routes. One is from Box Bridge, to drive along the canal road. The second one is to enter from Narkel Bagan More in MAR, New Town. Drive towards Unitech and take right from the crossing in front of New town police station. Follow the road for 2 km and Aquatica will reached. Both the roads are decent as per Kolkata standard. There are options to drive straight from Narkel Bagan until Balaka Abasan and then follow the canal road or use one of the many New town roads.

Attractions
Aquatica has a number of rides including tremendously exciting ones like the Black Hole, the Wave Pool, Niagara Falls, surf racer, Tornado and the Aqua Dance Floor. Regular parties and Fashion shows are hosted here, especially in the winter. There are 55 well appointed Rooms with Conference Hall, Party Hall, Board Room, Food Courts available.

Controversies 
A resident of Prince Anwar Shah Road, had gone to Aquatica with his wife, daughter and brother on May 16. Ajay, who weighed around 90 kg, went to ride a slide with his brother around 3 pm. After sometime, though his brother came down, Ajay was reportedly found unconscious on the slide. He was rushed to Khusi Nursing Home, from where he was referred to Medica Hospital, where he was declared brought dead on arrival. A case under Section 304A (death by negligence ) and 34 (act done by several person in furtherance of common intention) of the IPC was registered against the authorities of Aquatica and also against the doctors of Khusi Nursing Home.

References 

www.aquaticaindia.in

Tourist attractions in North 24 Parganas district
Parks in Kolkata
Water parks in India
New Town, Kolkata
1999 establishments in West Bengal
Amusement parks opened in 1999